County routes in Broome County, New York, United States, are signed with the Manual on Uniform Traffic Control Devices-standard yellow-on-blue pentagon route marker. Even numbered routes are east–west roads that increase by multiples of four from south to north with the exceptions of CR 70 and CR 86, while odd numbered routes are north–south roads that increase by multiples of four from west to east. No county routes enter the city of Binghamton and only a few enter incorporated villages.

Routes 1–100

Routes 101–200

Routes 201 and up

Notes 
1. Some county route numbers are skipped due to decommissioning or other reasons; for example, there is no CR 12 or CR 88.

See also

County routes in New York

References

External links
Empire State Roads – Broome County Roads